, better known as just , is a Japanese actress.

She was born in Saitama Prefecture. When she graduated from high-school she decided to focus her career entirely on acting.
As of 2009, she shortened her stage name and is now simply going by "Natsuna" (夏菜). In 2012, she landed the coveted lead role in the NHK Asadora Jun to Ai after an audition of over 2250 actors.

Appearances

TV dramas 
 Gachi Baka (TBS, 2006), Hikari Seike
 Kiraware Matsuko no Issho (TBS, 2006), Kumi Kawajiri
 Erai Tokoroni Totsuide Shimatta (TV Asahi, 2007), Nao Yamamoto
 Kodoku no Kake: Itoshiki Hitoyo (TBS, 2007), Mika Inui
 Mop Girl (TV Asahi, 2007), Tamaki Nakamura
 Ando Natsu (TBS, 2008), Miyo
 Daimajin Kanon (TV Tokyo, 2010), Saki Uehara
 Quartet (MBS, 2011), Kasumi
 Okusama wa 18-sai (Fuji TV Two, 2011), Asuka Takagi
 Another Gantz (NTV, 2011), Kei Kishimoto
 Shima Shima (TBS, 2011), Yumi Tachibana
 Ore no Sora: Keijihen (TV Asahi, 2011), Hitomi Misaki
 Miyuki Miyabe 4-shū Renzoku Mystery "Snark Gari" (TBS, 2012), Noriko Kokubun
 Jun to Ai (NHK, 2012), Jun Machida
 Doubles: Futari no Keiji (TV Asahi, 2013), Aki Miyata
 Jun to Ai Special: Fujiko no Kareina Ichinichi (NHK BS Premium, 2013), Jun Machida
 Jinsei ga Tokimeku Katazuke no Mahou (NTV, 2013), Kaoru Futagotamagawa
 Yonimo Kimyōna Monogatari: '13 Aki no Tokubetsu Hen "0.03 Frame no Onna" (Fuji TV, 2013)
 Kamen Teacher (NTV, 2014), Maya Gatō
 Gokuaku Ganbo Episode 1 (Fuji TV, 2014), Satomi Yashiki
 Last Doctor: Kansatsui Akita no Kenshi Houkoku Episode  1 (TV Tokyo, 2014), Rika Suyama
 Ōedo Sōsamō 2015: Onmitsu Dōshin, Aku o Kiru! (TV Tokyo, 2015), Okichi Shiranui
 Meikyū Sousa (TV Asahi, 2015), Asako Takasu
 Scoop Yūgun Kisha Kyōichi Fuse (TBS, 2015), Eriko Kayama
 Hotel Concierge (TBS, 2015), Arisa Takagaki
 Watashitachi ga Propose Sarenainoniwa, 101 no Riyū ga Atte Dana Season 2 Episode 3 (LaLa TV, 2015), Yuri
 Specialist (TV Asahi, 2016), Maria Azuma

TV movies 
 Miracle Voice (TBS, 2008), Yumi Inagaki
 Ranma ½ (NTV, 2011), Ranma Saotome (female)

Films 
 Kimi ni Todoke (2010), Ayane Yano
 Gantz (2011), Kei Kishimoto
 Gantz: Perfect Answer (2011), Kei Kishimoto
 Kankin Tantei (2013), Akane
 Tigermask (2013), Ruriko Wakatsuki
 Koi to Onchi no Houteishiki (2014), Midori Yamabuki
 Clover (2014), Shiori Tsutsui
 Nagashiya Teppei (2015), Akemi Shiina
 Kagami no Naka no Egao Tachi (2015), Mari Takahashi
 Tanuma Ryokan no Kiseki (2015), Nao Nishikawa
 Fullmetal Alchemist (2017), Maria Ross
 Saki (2017), Yasuko Fujita
 ReLIFE (2017), Kokoro Amatsu
 Gintama 2 (2018), Ayame Sarutobi
 The Door into Summer (2021), Suzu Shiraishi
 189 (2021)

Commercials 
 Mobit (2011)
 Japan Post Service
 Nenga Hagaki spokesperson (2011)
 Youpack spokesperson (2013)
 Unicharm – Sofy (2012)
 Choya Umeshu – Umesshu (2012)
 Daiichi Sankyo Healthcare – Kakonāru 2 (2012)
 Aigan (2013)
 Tsukamoto – Kimono Journal "Ichigo" (2013)

Stage 
 Tokubetuhou Dai 001-jō Dust (New National Theatre Tokyo, January 14, 2009 – January 27, 2009), Mayu Sakurai
 Nurui Doku (Kinokuniya Hall, September 13, 2013 – September 26, 2013), Yuri Kumada

Bibliography

Photobooks 
 Natsuna Gantz/K (Shueisha, April 22, 2011), 
 727_8766 (Tokyo News Service, May 23, 2013), 
 The Gravure (Shueisha, January 27, 2014),

References

External links 
  
 TV appearances 
 

Japanese television personalities
Japanese television actresses
1989 births
Living people
21st-century Japanese actresses
Actors from Saitama Prefecture
Asadora lead actors
Models from Saitama Prefecture
People from Saitama Prefecture